Kelly-Ann Allen (born in Adelaide, Australia) is a Fellow of the Australian Psychological Society, an Associate Professor in the Faculty of Education at Monash University, Clayton campus, Melbourne, Australia, and an Educational and Developmental Psychologist. Allen gained her PhD in 2014 from the University of Melbourne on the subject of School Belonging which continues to be her main academic focus. Allen is a qualified school psychologist as well as an established academic. Allen has made significant contributions to the field of belonging and school psychology and has published over 170 outputs in these fields. She has gained national and international recognition for the quality of her work and recently was named as one of Australia's top academic researchers.

References 

Australian psychologists
Scientists from Adelaide
University of Melbourne alumni
Academic staff of Monash University
Year of birth missing (living people)
Living people
21st-century psychologists
Australian women psychologists